The superior thoracic artery (highest thoracic artery) is a small artery located near the armpit in humans. It normally arises from the first division of the axillary artery, but may arise from the thoracoacromial artery, itself a branch of the second division of the axillary artery.

Running forward and medially along the upper border of the pectoralis minor, the superior thoracic artery passes between it and the pectoralis major to the side of the chest.

It supplies branches to the first and second intercostal spaces as well as to the superior portion of serratus anterior.

It anastomoses with the internal thoracic artery and superior two anterior intercostal arteries.

References

External links
 

Arteries of the upper limb